Mao Zhongwu is a Chinese paralympic cross country skier.

Career
He competed in the Cross-country skiing at the 2022 Winter Paralympics competition, winning the gold medal in the 10 kilometre free, and silver medals in the 18 kilometre long-distance event and the 1.5 kilometre sprint event.

References

External links 

Living people
Place of birth missing (living people)
Year of birth missing (living people)
Cross-country skiers at the 2022 Winter Paralympics
Medalists at the 2022 Winter Paralympics
Paralympic gold medalists for China
Paralympic silver medalists for China
Paralympic medalists in cross-country skiing
21st-century Chinese people